Alexander James Hamilton (born 2 December 1967) is a British contemporary environmental artist best known for his figurative and vanitas works using the medium of water.

Career 
 

Hamilton's work is noted for its intricate compositions that are submerged in large volumes of purified water, which are then photographed as still life images which retain the clarity and semblance of fine art paintings and the look of Caravaggio's Chiaroscuro. Hamilton works with the subtle distortions and reflections caused by the movement of water. He is a photographic purist, whose underwater scenes are documented only by analogue camera, without any post-production or digital editing. His work explores ‘the moral issue’ and the ‘future of the world’.

In 1990, Hamilton established  the Distil Ennui Studio, the umbrella from under which he operates, exhibits and hosts artist residencies around the world mentoring young artists.

In 2012 Hamilton published a book titled Tokyo Taxi celebrating Japanese lighting design - Publisher: Merrell Publishers Ltd - .

In 2012 his culture-driven work saw him re-locate an entire art production to Moscow to the historic Red October chocolate factory to launch his exhibition Rastvorennaya Pechal held at the Triumph Gallery, Moscow. In 2015, his Oil + Water project was shortlisted for ‘Environmental photographer of the year 2015’ award.

In 2018, Hamilton donated a collection of his artworks from Visions from the shoreline to fund the first plastic and aluminium fully recycling facility based in Maldives.

In 2019 Hamilton re-opened a disused photographic paper factory closed since the 1970's to host the 'Dark Vat' artist residency, in Krasnoyarsk, Siberia. 12 young Russian artists participated in the 3 month residency. The resulting public exhibition changed the landscape of art in the region of Krasnoyarsk, Siberia.

In 2020 Hamilton worked with the local community to re-open the last standing Baroque Carmelita Convent still standing in Spain. The convent had been closed to the public for over 170 years. Hamilton hosted the exhibition Renaciendo, the artist bequest a museum standard lighting system to the space to ensure its future public use and restoration.

References

External links
 Distil Ennui Studio™ Website

Living people
1967 births
English artists
British photographers
British contemporary artists
Contemporary painters